Isaac Sharpless, Sc.D., LL.D., L.H.D. (1848–1920) was an American educator, born in Chester County, Pennsylvania.

He graduated from Harvard in 1873 and received the honorary degree of Doctor of Divinity from there in 1915.  He was employed at Haverford College for many years, becoming professor in 1879, dean in 1884, and president in 1887. In 1884, he was elected as a member of the American Philosophical Society.

His birthplace, the Sharpless Homestead, is listed on the National Register of Historic Places.

Books

 Astronomy for Schools and General Readers (1882; fifth edition, revised, 1912)  
 English Education in the Elementary and Secondary Schools, in the "International Education Series"  (1892)  
 A Quaker Experiment in Government (1898)  
 Two Centuries of Pennsylvania History (1900)  
 Quakerism and Politics (1905)  
 The Quaker Boy on the Farm and At School (1908)
 The American College'' (1915)

References

Isaac Sharpless Papers, 1876-1987 (Biographical background; Isaac Sharpless (1848-1920) was the president of Haverford College from 1887) at haverford.edu
 
What’s in a Name? An All-Knowing President, an Autograph Collection, and Decorative Rights: The Origins of the Names of Some of Haverford’s Most Famous Buildings By Liz Turrin at biconews.com

External links
 Excerpts from Sharpless’s A Quaker Experiment in Government

1848 births
1920 deaths
People from Chester County, Pennsylvania
Historians from Pennsylvania
Haverford College faculty
Harvard University alumni
Presidents of Haverford College
Members of the American Philosophical Society